Robbyn Hermitage (born April 22, 1970 in Montreal, Quebec) is a badminton player from Canada, who won the gold medal in the women's doubles competition at the 1999 Pan American Games alongside Milaine Cloutier. She also took away silver from that tournament, winning in the mixed doubles competition partnering Brent Olynyk. A resident of Surrey, British Columbia, she represented Canada at the 2000 Summer Olympics.

References
 Canadian Olympic Committee

1970 births
Living people
Badminton players at the 2000 Summer Olympics
Canadian female badminton players
Olympic badminton players of Canada
Sportspeople from Montreal
Badminton players at the 1999 Pan American Games
Badminton players at the 1995 Pan American Games
Pan American Games gold medalists for Canada
Pan American Games silver medalists for Canada
Pan American Games medalists in badminton
Commonwealth Games competitors for Canada
Badminton players at the 2002 Commonwealth Games
Badminton players at the 1998 Commonwealth Games
Medalists at the 1995 Pan American Games
Medalists at the 1999 Pan American Games